Justice Brown may refer to:

Allyn L. Brown, chief justice of the Connecticut Supreme Court
Armstead Brown, associate justice of the Florida Supreme Court from 1925 to 1946
Calvin Brown, chief justice of the Minnesota Supreme Court
Charles Stuart Brown, associate justice of the Wyoming Supreme Court
Clifford F. Brown, associate justice of the Ohio Supreme Court
Eric Brown (judge), chief justice of the Ohio Supreme Court
Ethan Allen Brown, associate justice of the Ohio Supreme Court
G. A. Brown, associate justice of the Oklahoma Supreme Court
George Brown (Rhode Island politician) (1746–1836), associate justice of the Rhode Island Supreme Court
George H. Brown (North Carolina judge) (1850–1926), associate justice of the North Carolina Supreme Court
George H. Brown Jr. (Tennessee judge) (born 1939), associate justice of the Tennessee Supreme Court
George Houston Brown, associate justice of the New Jersey Supreme Court
George M. Brown, associate justice of the Oregon Supreme Court
Henry Billings Brown, associate justice of the Supreme Court of the United States
Herbert R. Brown, associate justice of the Ohio Supreme Court
J. Hay Brown, chief justice of the Supreme Court of Pennsylvania
James H. Brown (judge), associate justice of the Supreme Court of Appeals of West Virginia
James Brown (South Dakota judge), associate justice of the South Dakota Supreme Court
Janice Rogers Brown, associate justice of the California Supreme Court
Jean Brown (judge), associate justice of the Alabama Supreme Court
Jeff Brown (judge), associate justice of the Texas Supreme Court
Joel B. Brown, associate justice of the Alabama Supreme Court
John Chilton Brown, associate justice of the Supreme Court of Missouri
John W. Brown (New York politician), ex officio a judge of the New York Court of Appeals
Joseph E. Brown, chief justice of the Supreme Court of the state of Georgia
Lloyd O. Brown, associate justice of the Ohio Supreme Court
Lyle Brown, associate justice of the Arkansas Supreme Court
Nathan Brown (judge), associate justice of the Rhode Island Supreme Court
Paul W. Brown, associate justice of the Ohio Supreme Court
Philip E. Brown, associate justice of the Minnesota Supreme Court
Robert L. Brown (Arkansas judge), associate justice of the Arkansas Supreme Court
Russell Brown (judge), Puisne justice of the Supreme Court of Canada
Thomas Jefferson Brown, associate justice of the Texas Supreme Court
Timothy Brown (judge), associate justice of the Wisconsin Supreme Court
William Brown (Massachusetts judge), associate justice of the Massachusetts Supreme Judicial Court
William B. Brown, associate justice of the Ohio Supreme Court
William Little Brown, associate justice of the Tennessee Supreme Court
Yvette McGee Brown, associate justice of the Ohio Supreme Court

See also
Judge Brown (disambiguation)
Jefferson B. Browne, associate justice of the Florida Supreme Court
Thomas C. Browne, associate justice of the Illinois Supreme Court